Coordinating Ministry for Economic Affairs is the Indonesian government ministry in charge of planning and policy co-ordination, as well as synchronisation of policies in the fields of economics. The ministry is led by a Coordinating Minister for Economics Affairs, who is Airlangga Hartarto since .

Portfolio and function
Coordinating Ministry for Economic Affairs has responsibility to co-ordinate, synchronise and control ministries responsibilities in economic affairs. Coordinating Ministry for Economic Affairs has functions to 
 co-ordinate and synchronise of formulation, establishment and implementation ministries policies in economic affairs
 control ministries policies implementation in economic affairs
 co-ordinate the implementation of the task, development, and providing administrative support to all elements of the organisation within the Coordinating Ministry for Economic Affairs
 manage of state wealth in the responsibility of the Coordinating Ministry for Economic Affairs
 supervise the execution of duties in the Coordinating Ministry for Economic Affairs
 execute of certain tasks given by the President

Coordinated ministries
Coordinated ministries in Coordinating Ministry for Economic Affairs are
 Ministry of Finance
 Ministry of Industry
 Ministry of Trade
 Ministry of Agriculture
 Ministry of Manpower
 Ministry of Cooperation and Small & Medium Enterprises
 Ministry of State Owned Enterprises
 Ministry of Public Works and People's Housing
 Ministry of Land and Spatial Planning
 Ministry of Environment and Forestry

Minister
Coordinating Minister for Economic Affairs and their forerunner is listed below.

References

Government of Indonesia